Giulio Zorzi (born 3 January 1989 in Johannesburg) is a South African swimmer who specializes in breaststroke events. At the 2013 FINA World Championships in Barcelona, Spain, Zorzi handed the entire medal haul for the South Africans with a one-three finish, as he picked up the bronze in 27.04.

Biography
Zorzi was brought up in Pretoria with a strong Italian influence at home, due to his father’s origins. From an early age he started swimming and training with Olympic gold medallist and Elite Team member Cameron van der Burgh, who has become a close friend.

After steady progress in 2011-12 international competition, 2013 emerged as Zorzi’s breakthrough year as he won 50m breaststroke gold at the 2013 Summer Universiade in Kazan, Russia, before going on to the 2013 FINA World Championships in Barcelona, Spain, two weeks later. Having finished sixth in the heats, he had a difficult semi-final, but nonetheless qualified in the eighth spot for the final. Zorzi surprised everyone by finishing third from lane 8, one-hundredth of a second ahead of fourth place. The result delighted Van Der Burgh, who called Zorzi up alongside him on the podium to sing the South African anthem arm-in-arm.

Along with Van Der Burgh, Zorzi is coached by German Dirk Lange, who is based in Austria and only sees his protégés a few times a year. He trains at the Players Swim Club in Pretoria under the guidance of local coach Grant Kritzinger.

References

External links
  Giulio Zorzi – Athlete profile at BCN2013.com

1989 births
Living people
White South African people
South African male swimmers
Male breaststroke swimmers
South African people of Italian descent
Swimmers from Johannesburg
World Aquatics Championships medalists in swimming
Italian South African
Universiade medalists in swimming
Universiade gold medalists for South Africa
Medalists at the 2013 Summer Universiade